The 2018–19 Highland Football League (known as the Breedon Highland League for sponsorship reasons) was the 116th season of the Highland Football League, and the fifth season as the fifth-tier of the Scottish football pyramid system. The season began on 28 July 2018 and ended on 27 April 2019. 

Cove Rangers were the defending champions and retained the title on 13 April 2019 with one match still to play, after a 1–0 win away to Forres Mechanics.

They faced the winners of the 2018–19 Lowland Football League (East Kilbride) in the Pyramid play-off, winning 5–1 on aggregate. Cove then defeated Berwick Rangers 7–0 on aggregate in the League Two play-off final to gain a place in Scottish League Two.

Teams

Fort William had given notice to withdraw from the league after years of struggling, but new investors came forward and the club opted to continue for at least another season. Champions Cove Rangers failed to gain promotion in the play-offs, so the league membership remained unchanged.

Stadia and locations
All grounds are equipped with floodlights as required by league regulations.

League table

Results

References

Highland Football League seasons
5
Scottish